Chalit Kanitasut (born 5 December 1940) is a Thai sprinter. He competed in the men's 4 × 100 metres relay at the 1964 Summer Olympics.

References

1940 births
Living people
Athletes (track and field) at the 1964 Summer Olympics
Chalit Kanitasut
Chalit Kanitasut
Place of birth missing (living people)